Miguel Flores Espinoza (11 October 1920 – 15 January 2002) was a Chilean football defender who played for Chile in the 1950 FIFA World Cup. He also played for Club Universidad de Chile.

References

External links

Profile of Miguel Flores 

1920 births
2002 deaths
Chilean footballers
Chile international footballers
Association football defenders
Universidad de Chile footballers
1949 South American Championship players
1950 FIFA World Cup players